Naomi Ruiz Walker (born 31 January 1992) is a Spanish female artistic gymnast who represented her nation at international competitions. She participated at the 2007 World Artistic Gymnastics Championships, and 2008 Artistic Gymnastics World Cup Final.

References

External links
https://web.archive.org/web/20090722101435/http://www.gymnasticsresults.com/2008/eurow.html

1992 births
Living people
Spanish female artistic gymnasts
Place of birth missing (living people)
21st-century Spanish women